Maria Gonzalez may refer to:

Sports
 Maria Isabel Gonzalez (born 1984), Guatemalan gymnast
 Maria Gonzalez, who participated in the judo competition for Cuba at the 2008 Summer Paralympics
 María González (javelin thrower) (born 1982), Venezuelan javelin thrower
 Maria Fernanda González Ramirez (born 1990), Mexican Olympic swimmer who swam at the 2008 and 2012 Olympics
 María Cruz González (born 1971), field hockey player
 Mariví González (born 1961), field hockey player
 María Guadalupe González (born 1989), Mexican racewalker
 Maria González (softball)
 Maria Gonzalez (Andorran gymnast)

Others
María del Pilar Ayuso González (born 1942), Spanish politician
María de los Ángeles Alvariño González (1916–2005), Spanish oceanographer
María del Carmen Concepción González, Cuban politician
Delfina and María de Jesús González, Mexican sisters
Maria Teresa Maia Gonzalez (born 1958), Portuguese writer
María Elena González (born 1957), Cuban-American artist
María José González, Miss Venezuela 2009
 María Teresa González, Puerto Rican politician 
 María Felicidad González (1884–1980), Paraguayan academic and feminist activist
 María Teresa González, Venezuelan artist
 María Dolores González Katarain (1954-1986), leader of Basque separatist group ETA

See also